Chérif Dine Akakpo (born 1 December 1997) is a Beninese professional footballer who plays as a goalkeeper for Beninese club Les Buffles and the Benin national team.

References 
 

1997 births
Living people
Beninese footballers
Benin international footballers
People from Parakou
Association football goalkeepers